The European Journal of Inorganic Chemistry is a weekly peer-reviewed scientific journal covering inorganic, organometallic, bioinorganic, and solid-state chemistry. It is published by Wiley-VCH on behalf of Chemistry Europe.

The journal, along with the European Journal of Organic Chemistry, was established in 1998 as the result of a merger of Chemische Berichte/Recueil, Bulletin de la Société Chimique de France, Bulletin des Sociétés Chimiques Belges, Gazzetta Chimica Italiana, Anales de Química, Chimika Chronika, Revista Portuguesa de Química, and ACH-Models in Chemistry.

According to the Journal Citation Reports, the journal has a 2021 impact factor of 2.551.

See also
List of chemistry journals
European Journal of Organic Chemistry

References

External links

Chemistry Europe academic journals
Publications established in 1998
English-language journals
Inorganic chemistry journals
Weekly journals
Wiley-VCH academic journals